Grace Christian School (GCS) is a private pre-K-12 Christian school located in Valrico, Florida, United States. It was established in 1974.

College courses 
GCS has partnered with Southeastern University to offer dual-enrollment classes.

Athletics 

The school's athletic teams are referred to as the Patriots. The school fields teams in soccer, volleyball, basketball, baseball and softball.

Views on sexuality 
In August 2022, it was announced via email that the school would recognise students only by the gender and name on their birth certificate, and would ask any LGBT students to leave the school. The email, sent by the school before the start of the school year, went on to say "Students who are found participating in these lifestyles will be asked to leave the school immediately."

References

External links 
 Official site

Christian schools in Florida
Educational institutions established in 1974
High schools in Hillsborough County, Florida
Private high schools in Florida
Private middle schools in Florida
1974 establishments in Florida